The Canon EF 38–76mm 4.5–5.6 is an EF mount wide-to-normal zoom lens.

Specifications

References

Canon EF lenses
Camera lenses introduced in 1995